José Almanzor (born 28 December 1929) is a Mexican archer. He competed in the men's individual event at the 1972 Summer Olympics.

References

1929 births
Living people
Mexican male archers
Olympic archers of Mexico
Archers at the 1972 Summer Olympics
Sportspeople from Guadalajara, Jalisco
20th-century Mexican people